Lepthercus is a genus of South African mygalomorph spiders in the family Entypesidae. It was first described by William Frederick Purcell in 1902. Originally placed with the Ctenizidae, it was transferred to the Nemesiidae in 1985, then to the Entypesidae in 2020.

Species
 it contains eleven species, found in South Africa:
Lepthercus confusus Ríos-Tamayo & Lyle, 2020 – South Africa
Lepthercus dippenaarae Ríos-Tamayo & Lyle, 2020 – South Africa
Lepthercus dregei Purcell, 1902 (type) – South Africa
Lepthercus engelbrechti Ríos-Tamayo & Lyle, 2020 – South Africa
Lepthercus filmeri Ríos-Tamayo & Lyle, 2020 – South Africa
Lepthercus haddadi Ríos-Tamayo & Lyle, 2020 – South Africa
Lepthercus kwazuluensis Ríos-Tamayo & Lyle, 2020 – South Africa
Lepthercus lawrencei Ríos-Tamayo & Lyle, 2020 – South Africa
Lepthercus mandelai Ríos-Tamayo & Lyle, 2020 – South Africa
Lepthercus rattrayi Hewitt, 1917 – South Africa
Lepthercus sofiae Ríos-Tamayo & Lyle, 2020 – South Africa

See also
 List of Entypesidae species

References

Further reading

Endemic fauna of South Africa
Mygalomorphae genera
Entypesidae
Spiders of South Africa